Hubertson Pauletta (born 3 June 1989) is a professional footballer from Curaçao, in the former Netherlands Antilles, who plays as a defender.

He played for Feyenoord AV.

References

1989 births
Living people
Dutch Antillean footballers
Curaçao footballers
RKC Waalwijk players
Eredivisie players
People from Willemstad
Curaçao international footballers
Association football defenders
Feyenoord players